Glassie is a surname. Notable people with the surname include:

 Henry Glassie (born 1941), American folklorist
 Nandi Glassie (1951–2020), Cook Islands politician
 Tere Glassie (born 1977), English rugby league footballer

See also
 Glasse